In Greek mythology, Alebion (Ancient Greek: Ἀλεβίων) or Albion of Liguria, was a son of Poseidon and brother of Bergion (also known as Dercynus). In some sources, the brother of Ialebion (Ἰαλεβίων) was named Ligys.

Mythology 
Alebion attacked Heracles with Dercynus when he passed through their country, Liguria in North-Western Italy, on his way back to Mycenae from Iberia having obtained the Cattle of Geryon as his tenth labour. The battle that followed was fierce; Albion and Dercynus (or Bergion) were supported by a numerous army. Hercules and his army were in a difficult position so he prayed to his father Zeus for help. With the aegis of Zeus, Heracles won the battle, and both brothers were killed. It was this kneeling position of Heracles, when he prayed to his father Zeus, that gave the name Engonasin (Ἐγγόνασιν, derived from ἐν γόνασιν), meaning "on his knees" or "the Kneeler" to Hercules' constellation. The story is also alluded to in Hyginus and Dionysius.

See also

Notes

References 

 Apollodorus, The Library with an English Translation by Sir James George Frazer, F.B.A., F.R.S. in 2 Volumes, Cambridge, MA, Harvard University Press; London, William Heinemann Ltd. 1921. ISBN 0-674-99135-4. Online version at the Perseus Digital Library. Greek text available from the same website.
Dionysus of Halicarnassus, Roman Antiquities. English translation by Earnest Cary in the Loeb Classical Library, 7 volumes. Harvard University Press, 1937–1950. Online version at Bill Thayer's Web Site
 Dionysius of Halicarnassus, Antiquitatum Romanarum quae supersunt, Vol I-IV. . Karl Jacoby. In Aedibus B.G. Teubneri. Leipzig. 1885. Greek text available at the Perseus Digital Library.
Gaius Julius Hyginus, Astronomica from The Myths of Hyginus translated and edited by Mary Grant. University of Kansas Publications in Humanistic Studies. Online version at the Topos Text Project.
John Tzetzes, Book of Histories, Book II-IV translated by Gary Berkowitz from the original Greek of T. Kiessling's edition of 1826. Online version at theoi.com

 on page 94

Children of Poseidon
Demigods in classical mythology
Heracles